Beltway Poetry Quarterly is an English-language, online literary magazine based in Washington, D.C., United States.

As its name suggests, it has featured poetry from the "Beltway" region of the Washington, DC area.   The publication has "showcased the richness and diversity of Washington area authors in every issue."  Special themes have included issues on Walt Whitman, "DC Places," and "The Evolving City."  In 2004 the quarterly featured a "Wartime Issue" covering poetic responses to the Iraq War.  The quarterly was founded in 2000 by Washington poet Kim Roberts.  Indran Amirthanayagam became the editor in early 2019. Sara Cahill Marron serves as associate editor. The journal now has both an international and domestic American focus, publishing poets from all over the world. It  also now features  translations and reviews as well as poems written in English.

History
Beltway Poetry Quarterly has published poems and essays on poets with strong regional ties. Featured poets have included: Kwame Alexander, Francisco Aragón, Naomi Ayala, Holly Bass, Richard Blanco, Sarah Browning, Regie Cabico, Kenneth Carroll, Grace Cavalieri, Michael Collier, Teri Ellen Cross, Kyle Dargan, Joel Dias-Porter, Cornelius Eady, David Gewanter, Martin Galvin, Brian Gilmore, Patricia Gray, Rod Jellema, Chungmi Kim, Barbara Lefcowitz, Merrill Leffler, Reb Livingston, Mark McMorris, E. Ethelbert Miller, Linda Pastan, Richard Peabody, Stanley Plumly, Myra Sklarew, Jane Shore, Rod Smith, Sharan Strange, Hilary Tham, Maureen Thorson, Dan Vera, Joshua Weiner, Reed Whittemore, and Terence Winch.

Guest editors have included Kwame Alexander, Naomi Ayala, Sarah Browning, Andrea Carter Brown, Regie Cabico, Grace Cavalieri, Terri Ellen Cross, Brian Gilmore, Merrill Leffler, Saundra Rose Maley, and Hilary Tham.

Since mid 2019, under its new editor Indran Amirthanayagam, the journal has cast its nets beyond the Beltway to embrace poets from all over the world. It also now publishes translations and reviews in every issue. 

For a more extensive list of poets featured in the quarterly, see the archives section of The Beltway Poetry Quarterly'''s official site.

In addition to the journal, the web site offers a Resource Bank with extensive links, useful to authors and their audiences in the Mid-Atlantic.  Granting organizations, reading series, publishers, libraries, museums, bookstores, blogs, and conferences are all covered. The site also provides the most complete listing available of artist residency programs in the US and the rest of the world.  The journal publishes a Poetry News page, updated monthly, with new book and journal releases, calls for entries, and area readings.

Critical reviews
The Washington Post has called Beltway Poetry Quarterly "a poetry journal with a yen for things Washingtonian" and writes, "These days a tasty verse morsel is just a mouse click away, thanks to Beltway."Beltway Poetry Quarterly authors have won "Best of the Net" awards, and the journal has been supported by grants from the DC Commission on the Arts and the Humanities Council of Washington, DC.  The editor was a finalist for the DC Mayor's Arts Awards in 2009 and won the 2008 Independent Voice Award from the Capital BookFest.

Press coverage of the journal has appeared in The Washington Post, Washington Blade, The Washington Times, Chickenbones: A Journal for Literary and Artistic African American Themes, The Chronicle of Higher Education, Sojourners'', and other publications.

Themes
The journal publishes four issues a year, often exploring particular themes. Recent issues have focused on Art in Times of Crises and the current The Dream Retuned. Past themes have included: Museums, The Evolving City, DC Places, Wartime, and poems inspired by Walt Whitman.  The journal has published an Audio issue, and several issues have been compiled by guest editors.

Every other year, Beltway Poetry publishes a special literary history issue, with tributes, interviews, and essays on influential poets who have lived or worked in Washington, DC.  Poets in history issues range from contemporary authors to poets living in the city in its early years.  They include: Ambrose Bierce, Sterling A. Brown, Ed Cox, Léon-Gontran Damas, Owen Dodson, Paul Laurence Dunbar, Roland Flint, Angelina Weld Grimké, Langston Hughes, Georgia Douglas Johnson, May Miller, Gaston Neal, Ezra Pound, Reetika Vazirani, and Walt Whitman.

References

External links
Beltway Poetry Quarterly official site

2000 establishments in Washington, D.C.
Magazines established in 2000
Magazines published in Washington, D.C.
Beltway Poetry Quarterly
Beltway Poetry Quarterly
Quarterly magazines published in the United States